Jennifer Lundquist (born 10 September 1991) is a Canadian female volleyball player. She is a member of the Canada women's national volleyball team. She was part of the Canadian national team at the 2014 FIVB Volleyball Women's World Championship in Italy.

References

1991 births
Living people
Canadian women's volleyball players
Place of birth missing (living people)
Volleyball players at the 2015 Pan American Games
Pan American Games competitors for Canada
Montana State Bobcats athletes
Expatriate volleyball players in the United States
Canadian expatriate sportspeople in the United States